sport auto is a German automobile magazine, established in 1969, published monthly by Motor Presse Stuttgart, based in Stuttgart.

The magazine publishes its "Supertest" of cars, featuring the laptime at the Nordschleife. Until 2015 almost all supertest were done by Horst von Saurma, from 2015 laptimes are recorder by Christian Gebhardt. The magazine also runs a challenge for the fastest lap time driven with a car that is road legal (TÜV) and registered in Germany. The road legality rule also applies for the tires.

Racing participation
The journalists usually enter VLN and 24 Hours Nürburgring races, in cooperation with Honda or Aston Martin. Results are mixed, they caused at least two crashes.

Sport Auto Trophy
In 1995, the magazine introduced a Nordschleife lap record challenge for the fastest lap time driven with a car that is road legal, having passed German TÜV and is registered in Germany. The road legality rule also applies for the tires. After the trophy had been given to Blitz, a Japanese tuning parts company in 1997, sport auto editor Horst v. Saurma regained the record in 1999. After the sport auto record was lowered to 7:14 in 2005, sport auto announced to introduce rules according to their Hockenheimring-based Tuner GP event. In 2005, sport auto also clocked a 6:55 for a UK-registered Radical SR8 which is not eligible to sport autos ranking.

 5 Supersportler auf der Nordschleife 
In 2008, five super sports cars owned by an enthusiast were compared by Porsche factory driver Marc Basseng, winner of several VLN races in Porsche GT3 RSR. Timing was provided by sport auto as in a Supertest. The results were also reported elsewhere.

 Supertest Nordschleife 
During the industry testing sessions in which sport auto records its "Supertest", the track can not be traveled at full speed past "Tribüne 13" (T13, grandstand 13) in order to allow safe access from the old exit/entrance there. The missing  uphill section, from a slow right hand corner, would take in average an extra 7 s compared to a full lap. 

The first is 
The second is 
The third is 
The fourth is 
The fifth is 
The total is 
In recent tests, about 33 numbers are reported to judge a cars performance on various points of a Ring lap: speeds, braking deceleration and lateral g-forces. Sortable list of some Supertest times are provided online.*' = optional tyres

See also
Nordschleife fastest lap times

References

External links 
 Website
 market share (motor presse stuttgart)
 (Gumpert Apollo 7:11.57)

1969 establishments in West Germany
Automobile magazines published in Germany
German-language magazines
Monthly magazines published in Germany
Magazines established in 1969
Magazines published in Stuttgart
Online magazines